The Rider News  is the weekly independent student newspaper of Rider University in Lawrenceville, New Jersey. The Rider News routinely wins top awards from the New Jersey Press Association and from the regional division of the Society of Professional Journalists, successfully competing against institutions from Maine to Eastern Pennsylvania.

The newspaper is available on campus and online for free. The Rider News publishes once a week on Wednesday from September to May during the academic year.
Meetings are held every Wednesday at 4:30 in the basement of Longstreet House.

We are always looking for Rider students who are writers, photographers, graphic designers and videographers!

Students are responsible for all aspects of the publication, including writing, editing, photography, design, as well as maintaining its digital and social media platforms.

About The Rider News 
Founded in 1930, the paper serves the entire Rider community. 
Each year, the student executive editor of The Rider News is awarded a full-tuition scholarship and the student managing editor is awarded a half-tuition scholarship. In addition, newspaper section editor posts are paid positions and serve as these students’ on-campus jobs.
Paid student roles include: executive editor, managing editor, news section editors, features and entertainment editors, opinion editor, sports editors, copy editors, ad manager, photo editor, video editor, design manager and circulation managers.

The list of current staff members can be found here: https://www.theridernews.com/staff/

Letter to the Editor
The Rider News is a public forum for community expression and welcomes letters to the editor. Letter requirements can be found here: https://www.theridernews.com/letters-to-the-editor/

All decisions are at the sole discretion of the editorial board, which may reject or postpone any letter. Send to The Rider News via email (ridernews@rider.edu) or campus mail. Letters are received on a rolling basis and published as space permits.

Place an Ad
Ads in The Rider News have a direct line to 3,500* educated, young consumers for 25 Wednesdays of the academic year. Rider is a private university in central New Jersey that reaps the benefits of easy access to New York City, Philadelphia and the Jersey Shore.

Ads surrounded by award-winning, student-produced news, sports, features, entertainment and opinion, will connect directly to students.

More information can be found: https://www.theridernews.com/place-an-ad/

References

External links 
 official site

See also
List of college newspapers

News
Newspapers established in 1930
Student newspapers published in New Jersey
1930 establishments in New Jersey